The 2012–13 Polish Cup was the fifty-ninth season of the annual Polish football knockout tournament. It began on 18 July 2012 with the first matches of the extra preliminary round and ended on 3 May 2013 with the final. The winners qualified for the second qualifying round of the 2013–14 UEFA Europa League. 

Legia Warsaw were the defending champions, having won their record breaking 15th title in the previous season. They successfully defended this title, becoming the winner of the Polish Cup for the 16th time in history.

Participating teams

Notes:
 The winner of Opole region preliminaries Start Bogdanowice changed its name to Odra Wodzisław. The two clubs merged in January 2012.

Round and draw dates

Extra preliminary round
The draw for this round was conducted at the headquarters of the Polish FA on 18 June 2012. Participating in this round were 16 regional cup winners and 35 teams from the 2011–12 II Liga. The matches were played on 18 July 2012. Pelikan Łowicz received a bye to the preliminary round.

! colspan="3" style="background:cornsilk;"|18 July 2012

|}
Notes:
 Calisia withdrew from the competition. 
 KSZO Ostrowiec Świętokrzyski withdrew from the competition.
 Stal Stalowa Wola withdrew from the competition. 
 Czarni Żagań withdrew from the competition.

Preliminary round
The draw for this round was conducted at the headquarters of the Polish FA on 18 June 2012. The matches were played on 24 and 25 July 2012. Stomil Olsztyn and Sokół Aleksandrów Łódzki received a bye to the first round.

! colspan="3" style="background:cornsilk;"|24 July 2012

|-
! colspan="3" style="background:cornsilk;"|25 July 2012

|}

First round
The draw for this round was conducted at the headquarters of the Polish FA on 26 July 2012. Participating in this round are the 12 winners of the preliminary round along with Stomil Olsztyn and Sokół Aleksandrów Łódzki and the 18 teams from 2011–12 I Liga (Poland). The matches will be played on 31 July–1 August 2012.

! colspan="3" style="background:cornsilk;"|31 July 2012

|-
! colspan="3" style="background:cornsilk;"|1 August 2012

|}
Notes:
 Ruch Radzionków withdrew from the competition.

Round of 32 
The draw for this round was conducted at the headquarters of the Polish FA on 26 July 2012. Participating in this round are the 16 winners of the first round along with and the 16 teams from 2011–12 Ekstraklasa. The matches will be played on 11–12 August 2012 with the exception of matches involving Legia Warsaw and Śląsk Wrocław.

! colspan="3" style="background:cornsilk;"|4 August 2012

|-
! colspan="3" style="background:cornsilk;"|5 August 2012

|-
! colspan="3" style="background:cornsilk;"|11 August 2012

|-
! colspan="3" style="background:cornsilk;"|12 August 2012

|}

Round of 16
The 16 winners from Round of 32 compete in this round. The matches will be played on 25–27 September and 2–3 October.

! colspan="3" style="background:cornsilk;"|25 September 2012

|-
! colspan="3" style="background:cornsilk;"|26 September 2012

|-
! colspan="3" style="background:cornsilk;"|27 September 2012

|-
! colspan="3" style="background:cornsilk;"|2 October 2012

|-
! colspan="3" style="background:cornsilk;"|3 October 2012

|}

Quarter-finals
The 8 winners from Round of 16 competed in this round.The matches will be played in two legs. The first leg took place on 26 and 28 February 2013, while the second legs were played on 12 and 13 March 2013.Pairs were determined on 24 October 2012.

Two second legs were moved to 26–27 March 2013 due to bad weather conditions. This is an official UEFA date and matches will be played without players called to the National Teams, what was agreed by interested teams.

|}

First leg

Second leg

Semi-finals
The 4 winners from the Quarterfinals will compete in this round.The matches will be played in two legs. The first legs took place on 10 April 2013, while the second legs were played on 17 April 2013.The two winners moved on to the final.

|}

First leg

Second leg

Final

First leg

Second leg

Legia Warsaw won 2–1 on aggregate.

Goalscores
6 goals
 Marek Saganowski (Legia Warsaw)
4 goals
 Rafał Boguski (Wisła Kraków)
 Vladimir Dvalishvili (Legia Warsaw)
 Tsvetan Genkov (Wisła Kraków)
 Rafał Leśniewski (Zawisza Bydgoszcz)
 Waldemar Sobota (Śląsk Wrocław)
3 goals
 Adam Cieśliński (Olimpia Grudziądz)
 Łukasz Gikiewicz (Śląsk Wrocław)
 Mirosław Kalista (Łysica II Bodzentyn)
 Tomasz Kupisz (Jagiellonia Białystok)
 Dariusz Michalak (Górnik Wałbrzych)
 Adrian Moszyk (Górnik Wałbrzych)
 Marek Śnieżawski (Sokół Ostróda)
 Paweł Wszołek (Polonia Warszawa)
 Łukasz Zaniewski (Okocimski Brzesko)
 Daniel Zinke (Górnik Wałbrzych)
2 goals
 26 players
1 goal
 161 players

See also
 2012–13 Ekstraklasa

References

Polish Cup
2012–13 in Polish football
Polish Cup seasons